Chuffilly-Roche is a commune in the Ardennes department in northern France. It was created, in 1828, by amalgamating the communes of Chuffilly-et-Coigny and Roche-et-Méry.

Population

Personalities
Arthur Rimbaud, French poet, lived for a while in Roche, where his family had a farm. He wrote several works there, notably Une saison en enfer (A Season in Hell) and Le bateau ivre (The Drunken Boat).

See also
Communes of the Ardennes department

References

Communes of Ardennes (department)
Ardennes communes articles needing translation from French Wikipedia